State Route 124 (SR 124) is part of Maine's system of numbered state highways, located in Androscoggin and Oxford counties. It runs from Mechanic Falls, passing through the towns of Minot and Hebron, and ends at Buckfield.

Route description
SR 124 begins at SR 11 and SR 121 at Mechanic Falls. The route heads north towards SR 119 at Minot where it shares a  concurrency. After passing SR 119, SR 124 continues heading north towards the town of Hebron. It then goes to Buckfield, where the route ends at SR 117.

Major junctions

References

External links

Maine State Route log via floodgap.com

124
Transportation in Androscoggin County, Maine
Transportation in Oxford County, Maine
Mechanic Falls, Maine